Lipovskaya Usadba is a rural locality (a village) in Gorod Vyazniki, Vyaznikovsky District, Vladimir Oblast, Russia. The population was 5 as of 2010.

Geography 
Lipovskaya Usadba is located on the Klyazma River, 11 km east of Vyazniki (the district's administrative centre) by road. Shchekino is the nearest rural locality.

References 

Rural localities in Vyaznikovsky District